Yawhen Barsukow (born 5 July 1990) is a Belarusian professional footballer who plays for Slavia Mozyr.

External links
 
 

1990 births
Living people
Belarusian footballers
Association football forwards
FC Gomel players
FC Rechitsa-2014 players
FC Lokomotiv Gomel players
FC Dnepr Mogilev players
FC Smolevichi players
FC Slavia Mozyr players